Elmer Jay Rieger (February 25, 1889 to October 21, 1959), was a Major League Baseball pitcher who played in  with the St. Louis Cardinals. He batted right and left and threw right-handed. Rieger had a 0–2 record, with a 5.48 ERA, in 13 games, in his one-year career.

He was born in Perris, California and died in Los Angeles, California.

External links

1889 births
1959 deaths
Major League Baseball pitchers
Baseball players from California
St. Louis Cardinals players
Los Angeles Angels (minor league) players
Shreveport Pirates (baseball) players
St. Paul Saints (AA) players
Portland Beavers players
Venice Tigers players
Vernon Tigers players
Seattle Rainiers players
Salt Lake City Bees players
Dallas Steers players
Shreveport Gassers players
People from Perris, California